V Capri are a new wave/power pop band formed in Perth, Western Australia in 1984, fronted by lead vocalist Tod Johnston, with Lance Karapetcoff on keyboards, Michael O'Brien on bass guitar, Alan Simpson on drums and Damian Ward on guitar. The band was popular locally but were unable to transfer this to the eastern states despite having signed with Mushroom Records. They released six top 100 singles in the Australian charts between April 1985 and June 1987.

History
V Capri are a new wave/power pop band formed in Perth, Western Australia in 1984, lead vocalist Tod Johnston (Manic D) and guitarist Damian Ward (Flavours, Perfect Strangers), they joined with Lance Karapetcoff on keyboards, Michael O'Brien on bass guitar and Alan Sampson on drums (both of whom were in Harlequin Tears). The band was popular in Perth and released their debut single, "Only a Movie" on the independent Theatre Label in April 1985, which reached the Perth top 10 but did not reach the top 50 nationally. Success in Perth led to signing with Mushroom Records and the release of further singles but they were unable to transfer their popularity in Perth to the eastern states. They released six further singles which all reached the top 10 in Perth, with "Haunting Me" and "That's the Way" peaking at #1 locally. The singles reached the top 100 in the Australian charts between April 1985 and June 1987. Their debut, and only album, In My World, was released by Mushroom Records in November 1986. It reached number 52 on the Australian charts on the Kent Music Report) in October 1986. The single "Haunting Me" had international release when used in the Australian television soap opera Neighbours at the end of Kylie Minogue’s final episode, it reached #77 on the UK Singles Chart in 1989.

Being interviewed in 2003 on Australian Music Online, Malcolm Clark (The Sleepy Jackson) remembered V Capri:

In My World was re-issued by Almacantar Records, a record label which specialises in 1980s releases, in the United States in 2006. The re-issued album features five bonus tracks including rare singles sides and unreleased tracks. According to their Facebook page they have reformed with the original line up as of 2010.

Members
Chronological order:
Tod Johnston – lead vocals
Lance Karapetkov – keyboards, vocals
Michael O'Brien – bass guitar, vocals
Alan Sampson – drums
Damian Ward – guitar
Clint Arnold – guitar
Dave Catteral – guitar

Discography

Singles

References

External links
V Capri fansite
V-Capri Facebook Page

Musical groups disestablished in 1989
Musical groups established in 1984
Western Australian musical groups